Fiji competed at the 2020 Summer Paralympics in Tokyo, Japan, which took place from 24 August to 5 September 2021. This was their ninth appearance at the Summer Paralympics. The Fijian team consists of 2 athletes competing in 1 sport.

Competitors
The following is the list of number of competitors participating in the Games.

Athletics 

Field

See also 
 Fiji at the Paralympics
 Fiji at the 2020 Summer Olympics

References

External links 
 2020 Summer Paralympics website

Nations at the 2020 Summer Paralympics
2020